"Flathead" is a song by Scottish indie band The Fratellis from their debut album, Costello Music, released on 4 March 2007; there was an EP released with the same name in the United States after it had been used in a commercial for Apple iPod.

On 11 March 2007, the song entered the Official UK Singles Chart at #67 on the strength of downloads alone, despite not being released as a single in the UK, after the song was used on an iPod/iTunes TV advert. It was also featured in the trailer for Shaun the Sheep on CBBC.

"Flathead" was also released as a download for the video game Rock Band.

Charts

Video

The video was directed by James Sutton and features the band playing with the three girls who appeared on the Costello Music album cover. In the video, three British glamour models who have appeared in various magazines play the three girls. Casey Batchelor plays the girl in the red dress, Natalie Oxley plays the girl in the green dress, and Charlotte McKenna plays the girl in the white dress. Despite the Costello Music album cover's similarity with the video, there are also a few differences. The girl in the red dress does not place a vinyl record of the single "Henrietta" down, and the singles of "Chelsea Dagger" and "Whistle for the Choir" are not on the floor next to the girls, like on the cover. The bottle with the F on it is also not featured in the video. The video had huge success in the USA and launched James Sutton into the spotlight.

2006 singles
British songs
The Fratellis songs
2006 songs
Songs written by Jon Fratelli